The Mossberg 715T is a semi-automatic rifle that was produced by O.F. Mossberg & Sons. It is a variant of the  Mossberg 702 Plinkster, designed with an AR-15-style stock and body. It is chambered for .22 Long Rifle and comes with a 10-round or 25-round magazine. Now possibly classified as prohibited in Canada due to it being improperly classified as an AR-15 Variant even though it has no internal components in common with the AR-15 rifle.

History
The 715T was originally produced with an adjustable rear sight mount (with integrated carry handle) and an adjustable front sight. In 2012, a "Flat Top" version was introduced with removable and adjustable front and rear sights, along with a Picatinny rail. The Flat Top was also available in Red Dot Combo and Camo models.

In 2014, Mossberg introduced the 715P, a pistol style version also based on the 702 Plinkster. A "Duck Commander" model of the 715P featured an electronic sight and a camouflage-pattern stock.

References

Further reading

External links
 Owner's manual at mossberg.com
 Mossberg 715T Tactical .22 Review and Shoot via YouTube
 Mossberg 715P Review and Shoot via YouTube

Semi-automatic rifles of the United States
715T